The 2019–20 Canberra Capitals season is the 36th season for the franchise in the Women's National Basketball League (WNBL). The Capitals were the defending champions and they successfully defended their title, taking home their ninth championship with a 2–0 win over the Southside Flyers.

University of Canberra remain as the owners and naming rights partner of the Capitals.

Roster

Standings

Results

Pre-season

Regular season

Finals

Semi-finals

Grand Final

Awards

In-season

Post-season

Club Awards

References

External links
Canberra Capitals Official website

2019–20 WNBL season
WNBL seasons by team
2019–20 in Australian basketball
Basketball,Canberra Capitals
Basketball,Canberra Capitals